Gather is a documentary film about Native American efforts for food sovereignty, directed by Sanjay Rawal and released in 2020. The film follows efforts by various people and groups to reclaim ancestral foodways. It was positively reviewed by critics, and named a Critic's Pick by The New York Times in September 2020.

Synopsis 
Gather follows attempts by Native Americans to reclaim the foodways of their ancestors. The documentary opens with a quote from Crazy Horse:

Chef Nephi Craig works to start Café Gozhóó, a restaurant that will serve traditional Apache food and train people recovering from addiction to cook it. Fred DuBray and his daughter Elsie DuBray work with bison in the Cheyenne River Lakota Nation, while the Ancestral Guard made up of Sammy Gensaw III and other Yurok men in Northern California practice and teach their tribe's traditional practices for fishing and preparing salmon on the Klamath River. Twila Cassadore studies and shares about the historical agricultural practices of the San Carlos Apache, White Mountain Apache, and Yavapai peoples.

Production 
Gather was directed by Sanjay Rawal and co-produced by the First Nations Development Institute. The executive producer was Jason Momoa, additional producers included Tanya Meillier and Sterlin Harjo, and the cinematographer was Renan Ozturk.

During the production process for Gather, the team producing the film sought grants which they used to hire Native American journalists (including Kim Baca) as well as photographers; they were charged with producing stories for media outlets about stories related to food sovereignty which would not be included in the final version of Gather.

Produced in the United States in the English language, Gather has a runtime of 74 minutes.

Release 
On March 11, 2020, a preliminary screening of Gather to an entirely Native audience in Colorado met with approval. The audience reaction reassured director Sanjay Rawal that he had created an appropriate documentary despite being non-Native himself.

Gather premiered at the Human Rights Watch Film Festival in 2020.

Gather was released on Apple TV+ and Amazon Prime Video on September 8, 2020. , viewing or screening it in Europe was only possible if a permission form had been approved by the producers of the documentary. On November 1, 2021, Gather was released on Netflix.

Critical reception 
Gather was described as "wide-ranging, addressing both systemic issues and small-scale solutions" in a YES! Magazine review by Valerie Schloredt. In Mother Jones, senior editor Maddie Oatman contrasted it with the Netflix documentary Kiss the Ground, writing that Kiss the Ground "remains sheltered under the auspices of modern capitalism" and glosses over the "struggle" and "violence" that Gather explores. In The New Republic, Jo Livingstone described its production style as "firmly rooted in the subject at hand". In the Spanish language version of Condé Nast Traveler, an article by Marc Casanovas titled  ("Why Gather is already the best documentary of the year in the United States") described the documentary as "a cry in favor of food sovereignty and the recognition of the generational trauma" ingrained in indigenous people.

Accolades 
Gather was awarded Best Documentary Feature at the Red Nation Film Festival Awards in 2020. It was named a Critic's Pick by The New York Times in September 2020. Gather won a James Beard Foundation Media Award for Best Documentary, awarded June 12, 2022.

References

External links 
 
 

Documentary films about Native Americans
Documentary films about food and drink
2020 documentary films
2020 films
2020s English-language films